Pablo Ignacio Galdames Millán (born 30 December 1996) is a Chilean professional footballer who plays as a midfielder for  club Cremonese on loan from Genoa. He represents the Chile national team.

Club career
On 31 August 2021, the last day of the 2021 summer transfer window, Galdames joined Serie A club Genoa on a deal until 2024.

On 31 January 2023, Galdames was loaned to Cremonese.

Personal life
He is the son of the Chilean former international footballer of the same name Pablo Galdames, brother of Thomas and Benjamín and half-brother of Mathías. In addition, through his maternal line, he and his brothers are related to the Spanish footballer Nerea Sánchez Millán.

Honours
Chile
 China Cup: 2017

Notes

References

External links
 
 
 Pablo Galdames at playmakerstats.com (English version of ceroacero.es)

1996 births
Living people
Footballers from Santiago
Chilean footballers
Association football midfielders
Chile international footballers
Chile under-20 international footballers
Chilean expatriate footballers
Unión Española footballers
Club Atlético Vélez Sarsfield footballers
Genoa C.F.C. players
U.S. Cremonese players
Segunda División Profesional de Chile players
Chilean Primera División players
Argentine Primera División players
Serie A players
Serie B players
2021 Copa América players
Chilean expatriate sportspeople in Argentina
Chilean expatriate sportspeople in Italy
Expatriate footballers in Argentina
Expatriate footballers in Italy
Chilean people of Mapuche descent 
Mapuche sportspeople
Indigenous sportspeople of the Americas